The 2009 Louisiana–Lafayette Ragin' Cajuns baseball team represented the University of Louisiana at Lafayette in the 2009 NCAA Division I baseball season. The Ragin' Cajuns played their home games at M. L. Tigue Moore Field and were led by fifteenth year head coach Tony Robichaux.

Roster

Coaching staff

Schedule and results

References

Louisiana Ragin' Cajuns baseball seasons
Louisiana-Lafayette baseball
Louisiana-Lafayette